Rife or  may refer to:

Geography
 Rife, Bhutan
 Rife, Alberta, a locality in the Municipal District of Bonnyville No. 87, Alberta, Canada
 Rife House (Rogers, Arkansas), U.S.
 Rife Farmstead Osage Mills, Arkansas, U.S.
 Rife House (Shawsville, Virginia), U.S.

People
 John Winebrenner Rife (1846–1908), Republican member of the U.S. House of Representatives
 Josh Rife (born 1979), American soccer player
 Joaquim Rifé (born 1942), Spanish footballer
 Royal Rife (1888-1971), promoter of medical treatments

Other uses
 Rife (Foetus album)
 Rife machine, an EMT device created by Royal Rife